Literaturfestival Zürich (alternative spelling: Zurich Literature Festival, formerly: Openair Literatur Festival Zürich) is an international literary festival held annually for the duration of a week in Zurich. The main stage of the festival is located in the middle of lush nature in the Old Botanical Garden in Zurich. 
The Festival is jointly presented by Literaturhaus Zürich and Kaufleuten, the two major institutions for literary events in Zurich. Founder and director of the festival is Swiss conceptual artist and curator Andreas Heusser who is curating the program together with Gesa Schneider and the management team of Kaufleuten.

The main program of the festival consists of premieres, performances and readings by acclaimed international authors. The format "Words on Stage - Best of Spoken Word" has also established itself as a permanent feature of the program and closing event of the festival. Part of the festival's curatorial signature is its interdisciplinary approach: the readings are often thematically linked with projects from other genres, e.g. poetic installations, interactive radio plays, scenic readings, singer/songwriter concerts, silent film screenings, or interdisciplinary performances at the intersection of text, dance, and theater. 
In interaction with nature and scenographic design, the aim is to create a "poetic overall experience" that involves all the senses. That is why the festival is often called "Switzerland's most beautiful literary festival".

Main program

2022 
 Marlon James (novelist) (JM)
 Tsitsi Dangarembga (ZW)
 Elvira Sastre (ES)
 David Grossman (IL)
 Ece Temelkuran (TR)
 Wolf Haas (AU)
 Words on Stage feat. Jule Weber, Reeto von Gunten, Christoph Simon, Fine Degen, Cachita

2021 
 Christoph Ransmayr (AT)
 Nina Kunz (CH)
 Carolin Emcke (DE)
 Arnon Grünberg (NL)
 Margarete Stokowski (DE/PL)
 Alice Hasters (DE)
 Pedro Lenz (CH)
 Jonas Lüscher (CH)
 Simone Lappert (CH)
 Leïla Slimani (FR/MA)
 Words on Stage feat. Gülsha Adilji, Ágota Dimén, Guy Krneta, Tanja Kummer, Rebekka Lindauer

2020 
The 8th festival edition was cancelled because of COVID-19.
The program included performances by Marlon James (novelist), Jhumpa Lahiri, Chris Kraus (American writer), Kwame Anthony Appiah, Uwe Timm, and others.

2019 
 Deborah Feldman (USA)
 Mia Couto (MOZ)
 Lukas Bärfuss (CH)
 Terézia Mora (HUN)
 Judith Schalansky (DE)
 Julian Barnes (GB)
 Roxane Gay (USA)
 Words on Stage feat. Helene Bockhorst (DE), Matto Kämpf (CH), Lara Stoll (CH), Interrobang (CH), Simon Chen (CH)

2018 
 John Banville (IRL)
 Sofi Oksanen (FIN)
 Rebecca Solnit (USA)
 Irvine Welsh (UK)
 Carolin Emcke (DE)
 Teju Cole (USA)
 Clemens J. Setz (A)
 Words on Stage feat. Knackeboul (CH), Patti Basler (CH), Renato Kaiser (CH), Lisa Christ (CH), Jens Nielsen (CH)

2017 
 John M. Coetzee (SA)
 Junot Díaz (DOM / USA)
 Judith Hermann (DE)
 Frank Spilker (Die Sterne) (DE)
 Anthony McCarten (NZL)
 Yvonne Adhiambo Owuor (KEN)
 Jozia (SA)
 Nora Bossong (DE)
 Words on Stage feat. Jochen Distelmeyer (Blumfeld) (DE), Jurczok 1001 (CH), Amina Abdulkadir (CH), Ariane von Graffenried (CH)

2016 
 David Mitchell (GB)
 Peter Sloterdijk (DE)
 Ayelet Gundar-Goshen (ISR)
 Shumona Sinha (F/IND)
 Judith Holofernes (DE)
 Margriet de Moor (NL)
 Ralf König (DE)
 Nell Zink (USA)
 "Dilettanten & Genies" feat. Michelle Steinbeck (CH), Christiane Heidrich (A), Rick Reuther (A), Carlo Spiller (CH), Sophie Steinbeck (CH), Gerd Sulzenbacher  (A), Matthias Vieider (A)

2015 
 John Cleese (GB) 
 Ruth Schweikert (CH)
 Xiaolu Guo (CN)
 Viktor Yerofeyev (RU) and Mikhail Shishkin (RU) 
 Sven Regener (DE)
 Wladimir Kaminer (DE)
 "Dilettanten & Genies" feat. Michael Fehr & Troller (CH), Anaïs Meier (CH), Jakob Kraner (A), Jopa Jotakin (AT), Jozia (SA) & Jordi Kemperman (NL), Sophie Steinbeck (CH), Tristan Marquardt (DE), Sebastian Steffen (CH), Oravin (DE)

2014 
 Marlene Streeruwitz (A) 
 Gerhard Polt (DE) 
 Güzin Kar (CH)
 Ben Moore (GB)
 Teju Cole (US) 
 Michael Stauffer (CH)
 Tino Hanekamp (DE)

2013 
 Olga Grjasnowa (DE) and Dorothee Elmiger (CH) 
 Wilhelm Genazino (DE) 
 Gerhard Meister (CH) 
 Martin Felder (CH) 
 Roger Willemsen (DE) 
 Harry Rowohlt (DE, cancelled due to illness, replaced with a second show by Roger Willemsen)
 Wiener Gruppe feat. Friedrich Achleitner and Gerhard Rühm (A)

See also

List of festivals in Switzerland
List of literary festivals

References

External links
 Literaturfestival Zürich | Official Website
 Website of Literaturhaus Zürich
 Website of Kaufleuten
 Website of Andreas Heusser

Festivals in Switzerland
Literary festivals in Switzerland
Annual events in Switzerland
Culture of Zürich